Christmas in Connecticut is a 1992 American made-for-television Christmas romantic comedy film directed by Arnold Schwarzenegger and starring Dyan Cannon, Kris Kristofferson and Tony Curtis.  It is a remake of the 1945 film of the same name.

Plot
Elizabeth is the star of a successful cooking show and author of several cookbooks. Alexander, her manager, sees a heroic forest ranger named Jefferson on the television news, saying he has lost his cabin in a fire and wishes he could get a home-cooked Christmas dinner. Alexander arranges for Elizabeth to do a special live show on Christmas, where she will cook a Christmas dinner for Jefferson. In reality, Elizabeth can't cook and trying to keep Jefferson and the viewing public from finding out may be a little difficult, especially on a live show.

Cast
 Dyan Cannon as Elizabeth Blane
 Kris Kristofferson as Jefferson Jones
 Tony Curtis as Alexander Yardley
 Richard Roundtree as Prescott
 Kelly Cinnante as Josie
 Arnold Schwarzenegger as Man in Chair in Front of Media Truck (uncredited cameo)

Reception
John Ferguson of Radio Times awarded the film two stars out of five.

See also
 List of Christmas films
 List of American films of 1992

References

External links
 
 
 
 

Remakes of American films
1992 television films
1992 films
1992 romantic comedy films
1990s Christmas comedy films
American Christmas comedy films
American romantic comedy films
Christmas television films
Films scored by Charles Fox
Films set in Connecticut
TNT Network original films
1990s English-language films
1990s American films